The SNCF locomotives BB 101 to BB 180 were a class of 1500 V DC 4-axle electric locomotives originally built for the Chemin de fer de Paris à Orléans in the 1920s. The class were built as part of an order for 200 locomotives of similar types and were initially used on the newly electrified Paris - Vierzon line before being displaced by the SNCF 2D2 5500 class.

After 1945 the units were used on freight trains between Paris and the area around Toulouse.

See also
SNCF BB 1-80, SNCF BB 200, SNCF BB 1320, SNCF BB 1420 - similar locomotives, part of the same order of 200 locomotives

References

Literature

External links

E.0101
00100
Standard gauge electric locomotives of France
1500 V DC locomotives
Railway locomotives introduced in 1924
Bo′Bo′ locomotives

Freight locomotives